Quảng Ngãi is a city in central Vietnam. It serves as the capital city of Quảng Ngãi Province. Quảng Ngãi City borders Tư Nghĩa District to the south and west, Sơn Tịnh District to the northwest and Bình Sơn District to the north. It has an area of 160,15 km² and population of 260,252 inhabitants.

Climate

Quảng Ngãi has a tropical monsoon climate (Köppen Am). Temperatures are very warm to hot year round, although they do fall substantially between October and March. The rainy season lasts from September to December with a major risk of typhoons and the dry season is from January to August.

Tourism
Quảng Ngãi has benefited little from Vietnamese tourist industry. English is not widely spoken and most hotels deal only with Vietnamese customers.

Local attractions include:
 Mỹ Lai Massacre Memorial Museum (12 km from Quảng Ngãi)
 Ba Tơ Garden
 Quảng Ngãi Square (Phạm Văn Đồng street)
 Trà Khúc River
 Tam Thương Quay 
 Thiên Bút Hill 
 General Museum of Quảng Ngãi Province
 Ly Son Island
 My Khe Beach (this is in Da Nang)
 Châu Sa Champa Citadel (Ancient Amaravati)

Transportation 
Quảng Ngãi has rail connections to North-South Railways via Quảng Ngãi railway station. Air transport is served by Chu Lai International Airport in nearby province of Quảng Nam.

Famous Quang Ngai people
 
Politician: Phạm Văn Đồng, Trương Định, Lê Văn Duyệt, Trần Đức Lương, Nguyễn Thị Diệu, Nguyễn Hòa Bình, Nguyễn Bá Loan
Entrepreneur: Nguyễn Văn Đạt, Cao Thị Ngọc Dung, Lê Thăng Long
Education: Lê Vinh Danh, Phan Kỳ Phùng
Religion: Thích Nhất Hạnh, Ching Hai
Sport: Hoàng Văn Phúc, Nguyễn Trần Duy Nhất, Phạm Thị Bình, Phan Thanh Hậu, Ngô Bông
Artist: Dương Ngọc Thái, Thanh Tuấn
Musician: Trương Quang Lục, Hồng Xương Long
Generals: Nguyễn Chánh (Quảng Ngãi), Trần Văn Trà, Trần Quý Hai, Phạm Kiệt, Võ Thứ, Nguyễn Đôn, Tiêu Văn Mẫn, Trịnh Lương Hy, Võ Bẩm, Trần Tiến Cung, Huỳnh Kim, Châu Khải Định, Lê Trung Ngôn, Phạm Quang Tiệp, Trần Nam Trung, Trần Quang Phương, Nguyễn Văn Được, Võ Thị Thái, Vũ Xuân Viên, Huỳnh Thị Cúc, Nguyễn Thị Dung, Nguyễn Tăng Long, Nguyễn Văn Xuân (tướng nhà Nguyễn)

Education

Le Khiet High School for the Gifted

References

External links

Populated places in Quảng Ngãi province
Provincial capitals in Vietnam
Districts of Quảng Ngãi province
Cities in Vietnam